Chondria may refer to:
 Chondria (alga), a red alga genus in the family Rhodomelaceae
 Chondria (beetle), an insect genus in the family Endomychidae